Westmont station is an elevated station on the PATCO Speedline in Haddon Township, New Jersey, United States. The station contains both metered and free parking and racks for up to 32 bicycles. Westmont station was built in a manner similar to that of nearby Collingswood station, with a single island platform. East of the station, the line descends from an elevated structure to an open cut. It is grouped with the Collingswood and Haddonfield Station in pricing from Philadelphia.

References

External links 
Westmont (PATCO)

Haddon Township, New Jersey
PATCO Speedline stations in New Jersey
Railway stations in the United States opened in 1969